Playbook may refer to:
 BlackBerry PlayBook, a tablet computer by BlackBerry
A book that contains a script or story for a theatrical play. This written version of the composition is used in preparing for a performance
Fleury Playbook, a medieval playbook kept in a French abbey until the French Revolution
In sport, a book describing plays that a player or team may run in games
Basketball playbook
American football plays
Playbook (TV series), a television show that airs on the NFL Network
The Playbook (2005 TV series), a television show that aired on Spike TV
The Playbook (How I Met Your Mother), the title of an episode of the television show How I Met Your Mother
The Playbook (2020 TV series), a docuseries
"Playbook", a daily feature of the political newspaper Politico
A document defining one or more business process workflows aimed at ensuring a consistent response to situations commonly encountered during the operation of the business
"Playbook", a series of stories in The Story Makers